I Trust You to Kill Me is the debut album by Rocco DeLuca and the Burden. It was released on CD on March 21, 2006 on the Ironworks label. The album was produced by Jude Cole and mixed by Florian Ammon, except for tracks 2, 7 and 10 which were mixed by Dave Reed. The album was engineered by Florian Ammon and Dave Reed.

Track listing

Chart information

References

Rocco DeLuca and the Burden albums
2006 debut albums